Mérignac may refer to :

Places
 Mérignac, Charente, a commune in the Charente department in southwestern France
 Mérignac, Charente-Maritime, a commune in the Charente-Maritime department in southwestern France
 Mérignac, Gironde, a commune in the Gironde department in southwestern France and largest suburb of the city of Bordeaux

Other uses
Bordeaux–Mérignac Airport, the international airport of Bordeaux, situated on the territory of Mérignac, Gironde
Mérignac Handball (MHB), handball club in the town of Mérignac, Gironde